Madeleine Yamechi Sielanou (born 6 March 1982) is a Camaroonian-French female weightlifter.

She represented Cameroon at the 2004 Summer Olympics. 
Later she started representing France at international competitions. 
She competed at world championships, including at the 2015 World Weightlifting Championships.

Major results

References

External links

 
http://www.alamy.com/stock-photo-frances-madeleine-yamechi-lifts-in-the-womens-69kg-weightlifting-class-119789254.html

http://www.gettyimages.com/photos/madeleine-yamechi?excludenudity=true&sort=mostpopular&mediatype=photography&phrase=madeleine%20yamechi&family=editorial

1982 births
Living people
French female weightlifters
Place of birth missing (living people)
Cameroonian emigrants to France
Cameroonian female weightlifters
Weightlifters at the 2002 Commonwealth Games
Weightlifters at the 2004 Summer Olympics
Olympic weightlifters of Cameroon
Commonwealth Games medallists in weightlifting
Commonwealth Games gold medallists for Cameroon
Medallists at the 2002 Commonwealth Games